is a Japanese actress. She starred in Masahiro Kobayashi's film Bashing, which was screened in competition at the 2005 Cannes Film Festival.

Career
Otuska has appeared in films such as Hirokazu Koreeda's I Wish and Yoshihiro Nakamura's See you tomorrow, everyone.  She also appeared in Shinji Aoyama's 2002 television film Mike Yokohama: A Forest with No Name.

Filmography

Film
 Quiet Days of firemen (1994)
 Hanako (1995)
 Swallowtail (1996)
 Ooi Naru Kan (1998)
 Film Noir (2000)
 The Guys from Paradise (2000)
 Man Walking on Snow (2001)
 Kikansha Sensei (2004)
 Bashing (2005)
 Female (2005)
 Limit of Love: Umizaru (2006)
 Hero (2007), Misuzu Nakamura
 Amalfi: Rewards of the Goddess (2009)
 Piecing Me Back Together (2010)
 I Wish (2011)
 It All Began When I Met You (2013)
 See You Tomorrow, Everyone (2013)
 Flight on the Water (2020)
 Daughters (2020)
 Georama Boy, Panorama Girl (2020)
 Mirai eno Katachi (2021)
 Gunkan Shōnen (2021)
 Dr. Coto's Clinic 2022 (2022), Mariko Nishiyama

Television
 Hero (2001–2014), Misuzu Nakamura
 Mike Yokohama: A Forest with No Name (2002)
 Dr. Coto's Clinic (2003–2006), Mariko Nishiyama
 Team Medical Dragon (2007)
 Around 40 (2008)
 Gonzo: Densetsu no Keiji (2008)
 Tokyo Dogs (2009)
 Saigo no Yakusoku (2010)
 Detective Conan: Shinichi Kudo's Written Challenge (2011), Eri Kisaki
 Kazoku no Uta (2012)
 Last Cinderella (2013)
 Zannen na Otto (2015)
 Influence (2021)

References

External links
 
 
 

1968 births
Living people
Japanese film actresses
Actresses from Tokyo
20th-century Japanese actresses
21st-century Japanese actresses